This list is of Major Sites Protected for their Historical and Cultural Value at the National Level in the Province of Gansu, People's Republic of China.

  

  

 

 

  

|}

See also
 Principles for the Conservation of Heritage Sites in China
 International Dunhuang Project

References

 
Gansu